General elections were held in Japan on 22 May 1958. The result was a victory for the Liberal Democratic Party, which won 298 of the 467 seats. Voter turnout was 77.0%.

Results

By prefecture

References

Japan
General election
General elections in Japan
Japanese general election
Election and referendum articles with incomplete results